Amaras a tu prójimo is a Mexican telenovela produced by Luis Vegas and Valentín Pimstein for Televisión Independiente de México in 1973.

Cast 
David Reynoso
Luz María Aguilar
Miguel Corcega
Xavier Marc
Julio Monterde
Miguel Suarez
Nerina Ferrer
Guillermo Orea
Silvia Derbez

References

External links 

Mexican telenovelas
1973 telenovelas
Televisa telenovelas
Spanish-language telenovelas
1973 Mexican television series debuts
1973 Mexican television series endings